Fernando Afonso of Portugal (1135 – 1 March 1207) was the twelfth Grand Master of the Knights Hospitaller, serving between 1202–1206. He was the oldest son of Afonso Henriques, the first king of the Kingdom of Portugal. Fernando would never inherit the crown as he was born out of wedlock. He formally succeeded the interim Grand Master Pierre de Mirmande installed after the death of Geoffroy de Donjon. He resigned in 1206 and was succeeded by Geoffroy le Rat.

Biography
Fernando Afonso was for a short period of time alferes-mor of the Kingdom of Portugal. He then proceeded to join the Knights Templar, followed later on by the Knights Hospitaller. He became Master of the Knights Hospitaller in the Iberian Peninsula in 1198, as part of the Langue de Castille, León and Portugal. He then became Grand Master of the Order in 1202. A few years later he renounced his position as Grand Master and returned to Portugal.

Not being able to make himself obeyed by the knights of the Order, they reproached him for having held the general chapter in the fortress of Margat outside the kingdom of Jerusalem, a reproach of very poor quality. The reason for this is rather that he had not held any responsibility in the Order. The only highlight of his magisterium was the promulgation of a new statute drawn up during the General Chapter, for which he was reproached. He eventually resigned from his office.

The last act is dated 1206 and the first act of his successor is also dated 1206, so it can be estimated that he gave up his office in mid-1206. This is the second time in the history of the Order that a Grand Master resigned. He retired to Portugal where he died on 1 March 1207, allegedly poisoned. He was succeeded by Geoffrey le Rat.

Burial 
His remains were buried in Santarém, at the Church of São João de Alporão.

See also

 Cartulaire général de l'Ordre des Hospitaliers
 List of Knights Hospitaller sites
 Langue (Knights Hospitaller)
 Flags of the Knights Hospitaller

References

Bibliography

External links
Alphonse de Portugal (grand maître). French Wikipedia.
Liste des grands maîtres de l'ordre de Saint-Jean de Jérusalem. French Wikipedia.
Eugène Harot, Essai d’armorial des Grands-Maîtres de l’Ordre de Saint Jean de Jérusalem.
Seals of the Grand Masters. Museum of the Order of St John.
Charles Moeller, Hospitallers of St. John of Jerusalem. Catholic Encyclopedia (1910). 7. New York: Robert Appleton Company.
	

1135 births
1207 deaths
People from Coimbra
12th-century Portuguese people
13th-century Portuguese people
Portuguese knights
Knights Hospitaller
Grand Masters of the Knights Hospitaller
People of the Reconquista
Portuguese people of French descent
Portuguese people of Spanish descent
Sons of kings